Mount Spohn is a prominent peak rising from Otway Massif, being the highest summit (3,240 m) on the ridge bordering the west side of Burgess Glacier. Named by Advisory Committee on Antarctic Names (US-ACAN) for Harry R. Spohn, United States Antarctic Research Program (USARP) meteorologist at South Pole Station, 1963.

Mountains of the Ross Dependency
Dufek Coast